Vladan Radonjić (born 15 June 1979) is a Serbian professional basketball strength and conditioning coach for Crvena zvezda of the EuroLeague and the ABA League. Further, he worked as a volleyball coach.

Early life and education
Radonjić was born in Gornji Milanovac, SR Serbia, SFR Yugoslavia, where he finished an elementary and a high school. He earned his bachelor's degree in physical education from the University of Belgrade in 2002 and earned his doctor's degree from Singidunum University in 2013. In 2004, he worked for the Serbian Institute of Sport and Sports Medicine.

Coaching career in basketball
In the 2007–08 BLS season, Radonjić worked for Swisslion Vršac as a strength and conditioning coach. In 2008, he joined the coaching staff of Partizan under head coach Duško Vujošević. He won three titles (Adriatic League, Serbian League, and Serbian Cup) in each of two season with Partizan, 2008–09 and 2009–10. In 2010, he accompanied Vujošević to CSKA Moscow. For the 2011–12 season, he returned to Partizan, at the time coached by Vlada Jovanović.

In 2012, he worked for Donetsk. In 2014, he worked for Igokea.

In November 2020, Radonjić joined the coaching staff of Partizan led by Sašo Filipovski.

In July 2022, Crvena zvezda hired Radonjić as their new strength and conditioning coach.

National teams 
In July/August 2009, Radonjić was a conditioning coach for the Serbia national under-18 team that won a gold medal at the FIBA Europe Under-18 Championship. Later, he briefly worked for the Montenegro national team under Luka Pavićević.

Coaching career in volleyball
Radonjić worked for women teams Rabita Baku (2013–2014), Volero Zürich (2014–2017), and Cannes (2017–2019).

Career achievements 
Basketball career
 Adriatic League champion: 2 (with Partizan: 2008–09, 2009–10)
 Serbian League champion: 3 (with Partizan: 2008–09, 2009–10, 2011–12)
 Championship of Bosnia and Herzegovina champion: 1 (with Igokea: 2013–14)
 Serbian Cup winner: 3 (with Partizan: 2008–09, 2009–10, 2011–12)

Volleyball career
 Swiss Women's Volleyball League champion: 3 (with Volero Zürich: 2014–15, 2015–16, 2016–17)
 Azerbaijan Women's Volleyball Super League champion: 1 (with Rabita Baku: 2013–14)
 French Women's Volleyball League champion: 1 (with Cannes: 2018–19)
 Swiss Volleyball Cup winner: 3 (with Volero Zürich: 2014–15, 2015–16, 2016–17)
 French Women's Volleyball Cup winner: 1 (with Cannes: 2017–18)

References

1979 births
Living people
KK Crvena zvezda assistant coaches
Serbian men's basketball coaches
Serbian expatriate basketball people in Bosnia and Herzegovina
Serbian expatriate basketball people in Montenegro
Serbian expatriate basketball people in Russia
Serbian expatriate basketball people in Ukraine
Serbian expatriate sportspeople in Azerbaijan
Serbian expatriate sportspeople in France
Serbian expatriate sportspeople in Switzerland
Serbian strength and conditioning coaches
Serbian volleyball coaches
People from Gornji Milanovac
University of Belgrade Faculty of Sport and Physical Education alumni